Itupiranga is a municipality in the state of Pará in the Northern region of Brazil.

Meitajé, an extinct Jê language belonging to the Timbira group, was once spoken just to the northeast of Itupiranga.

See also
List of municipalities in Pará

References

Municipalities in Pará